Pietro Fontana was an early 19th-century engineer. He was Secretary of the Accademia degli Ottusi di Spoleto (known later as the Accademia Spoletina) and founded the Società Agraria Spoletina. In 1812 he discovered the veins of lignite near Ruscio that were later exploited as an important mine.

19th-century Italian engineers
Year of death missing
Year of birth missing